Diploglossus microlepis, the small-lipped galliwasp, is a species of lizard of the Diploglossidae family. Almost nothing is known about this species, as the holotype, captured in 1831, has no geographic note.

References

Diploglossus
Reptiles described in 1831
Taxa named by John Edward Gray
Species known from a single specimen